Hudson-Odoi is a surname. Notable people with the surname include:

 Bradley Hudson-Odoi (born 1988), Ghanaian footballer
 Callum Hudson-Odoi (born 2000), English footballer, brother of Bradley

Compound surnames
Ghanaian surnames